"Never Let It Go" is a 2002 song written by Marcos Ubeda and recorded by Swedish group Afro-dite. The song won Melodifestivalen 2002 and was the  entry for the Eurovision Song Contest 2002, where it placed 8th out of 24 competing entries.

Melodifestivalen and the Eurovision Song Contest

"Never Let It Go" participated in the second heat of the 2002 Melodifestivalen which was held on 26 January 2002 at the Himmelstalundshallen indoor arena in Norrköping. The song was performed seventh of the eight competing entries and directly qualified to the contest final as the song which received the most telephone votes. On 1 March, during the final held at the Globe Arena in Stockholm, Afro-dite were the first of the ten competing acts to perform, and "Never Let It Go" won the contest with 248 points, receiving the highest number of votes from the regional juries and the public vote.

"Never Let It Go" was performed on 25 May 2002 at the Eurovision Song Contest in Tallinn, Estonia. Sweden was drawn to perform in twelfth position of the 24 competing entries, and subsequently Afro-dite finished in eighth place, receiving 72 points in total, including the maximum 12 points from Bosnia and Herzegovina.

Charts

Weekly charts

Year-end charts

Certifications
In 2002, "Never Let It Go" was certified platinum in Sweden.

References

Eurovision songs of Sweden
Eurovision songs of 2002
Melodifestivalen songs of 2002
Number-one singles in Sweden
Afro-dite songs
Songs written by Marcos Ubeda
2002 songs
Mariann Grammofon singles
2002 singles